The 1974 Cronulla-Sutherland Sharks season was the eighth in the club's history. They competed in the NSWRFL's 1974 Premiership as well as the 1974 Amco Cup.

Ladder

References

Cronulla-Sutherland Sharks seasons
Cronulla-Sutherland Sharks season
Cronulla-Sutherland Sharks season